Metasia arida is a moth in the family Crambidae. It was described by George Hampson in 1913. It is found in Nigeria, Sierra Leone and South Africa.

References

Moths described in 1913
Metasia